The list of all companies that have been included in the BSE SENSEX from its inception in 1986 are listed below. The base year of SENSEX is 1978–79 with a base value of 100. During the introduction of the SENSEX in 1986, some of the companies included in the base calculation in 1979 were removed and new companies were added.

The index is revised semi-annually in June and December.

Current

Previous

References

External links
 Indian Express Column on BSE SENSEX history
 BSE SENSEX - Official History
 Financial Express - Performance of BSE SENSEX between 1996 to 2001

 SENSEX
Lists of companies of India